Toi Toi is an inner suburb of Nelson, New Zealand. It lies to the southwest of Nelson city centre, inland from Britannia Heights and Washington Valley. Toi Toi is also known as Victory Village.

The population was 1665 in the 2013 census. This was an increase of 69 people since the 2006 Census.

Toi Toi features Victory Square and four other public parks: Emano East Reserve, Murphy North Reserve, St Lawrence Reserve and Vosper Reserve.

Demographics

Toi Toi had a population of 3,270 at the 2018 New Zealand census, an increase of 210 people (6.9%) since the 2013 census, and an increase of 162 people (5.2%) since the 2006 census. There were 1,173 households. There were 1,668 males and 1,605 females, giving a sex ratio of 1.04 males per female, with 774 people (23.7%) aged under 15 years, 663 (20.3%) aged 15 to 29, 1,530 (46.8%) aged 30 to 64, and 303 (9.3%) aged 65 or older.

Ethnicities were 72.2% European/Pākehā, 14.6% Māori, 4.1% Pacific peoples, 18.7% Asian, and 3.2% other ethnicities (totals add to more than 100% since people could identify with multiple ethnicities).

The proportion of people born overseas was 27.6%, compared with 27.1% nationally.

Although some people objected to giving their religion, 52.9% had no religion, 33.0% were Christian, 1.4% were Hindu, 0.2% were Muslim, 1.9% were Buddhist and 3.5% had other religions.

Of those at least 15 years old, 420 (16.8%) people had a bachelor or higher degree, and 642 (25.7%) people had no formal qualifications. The employment status of those at least 15 was that 1,191 (47.7%) people were employed full-time, 435 (17.4%) were part-time, and 117 (4.7%) were unemployed.

References

Suburbs of Nelson, New Zealand
Populated places in the Nelson Region